Alessandro Valerio (May 18, 1881 – May 30, 1955) was an Italian horse rider. He competed in the 1920 Summer Olympics and, with his horse Cento, won the silver medal in the individual jumping event.

References

External links 
 
 
 
 

1881 births
1955 deaths
Italian show jumping riders
Olympic equestrians of Italy
Italian male equestrians
Equestrians at the 1920 Summer Olympics
Olympic silver medalists for Italy
Olympic medalists in equestrian
Medalists at the 1920 Summer Olympics